Vitali Aleksandrovich Kovalenko (born March 17, 1934) is a Russian former volleyball player who competed for the Soviet Union in the 1964 Summer Olympics. In 1964 he was part of the Soviet team which won the gold medal in the Olympic tournament. He played five matches.

External links
 
 

1934 births
Living people
Soviet men's volleyball players
Olympic volleyball players of the Soviet Union
Volleyball players at the 1964 Summer Olympics
Olympic gold medalists for the Soviet Union
Olympic medalists in volleyball
Russian men's volleyball players
Medalists at the 1964 Summer Olympics